The Court of Appeal for Southern Norrland is one of the six appellate courts in the Swedish legal system.

References 

Courts in Sweden
Appellate courts